Higham Ferrers was a parliamentary borough in Northamptonshire, which was represented in the House of Commons from 1558 until 1832, when it was abolished by the Great Reform Act. It was one of the very small number of English boroughs in that period which was entitled to elect only one rather than two Members of Parliament.

History
The borough consisted of the parish of Higham Ferrers, a small market town in the east of Northamptonshire. In 1831, the population of the borough was 965, and it contained 169 houses; a further two houses were in the town but outside the boundaries of the borough.

Higham Ferrers was incorporated as a municipal borough in 1556 and was first summoned to elect a representative to the Parliament of 1557–1558. The right to vote was exercised by the Mayor, aldermen, burgesses (members of the town corporation), and freemen, provided they were householders in the borough and not receiving alms; in 1831 this comprised a total of 33 voters. Since the corporation elected its own successors and had the right to create freemen (which was sparingly used), this ensured that the power was self-perpetuating and usually entirely under the influence of the local landowner or "patron".

In the first few years of its existence, during the early Elizabethan period, Higham Ferrers seems to have been entirely under the sway of the Duchy of Lancaster, electing Duchy officers as its MPs, but later in the same reign the influence of the local landed families became more evident, in particular the Hattons and the Montagus of Boughton. From the start of the 18th century, however, the Watson-Wentworth family, later Marquesses of Rockingham, owned the borough and exercised an unchallenged right to nominate its MP; on the death of the 2nd Marquess in 1784, the patronage passed to his nephew and heir, the Earl Fitzwilliam, who still retained it at the time of the Reform Act.

Higham Ferrers was abolished as a constituency by the Reform Act, those of its inhabitants who were qualified subsequently voting in the Northern division of the county.

Members of Parliament

1558–1640

1640–1832

Notes

References 

Robert Beatson, A Chronological Register of Both Houses of Parliament (London: Longman, Hurst, Res & Orme, 1807) 
D Brunton & D H Pennington, Members of the Long Parliament (London: George Allen & Unwin, 1954)
Cobbett's Parliamentary history of England, from the Norman Conquest in 1066 to the year 1803 (London: Thomas Hansard, 1808) 
J. E. Neale, The Elizabethan House of Commons (London: Jonathan Cape, 1949)
T. H. B. Oldfield, The Representative History of Great Britain and Ireland (London: Baldwin, Cradock & Joy, 1816)
 Edward Porritt and Annie G Porritt, The Unreformed House of Commons (Cambridge University Press, 1903)
 J Holladay Philbin, Parliamentary Representation 1832 – England and Wales (New Haven: Yale University Press, 1965)
Henry Stooks Smith, The Parliaments of England from 1715 to 1847 (2nd edition, edited by FWS Craig – Chichester: Parliamentary Reference Publications, 1973)

Parliamentary constituencies in Northamptonshire (historic)
Constituencies of the Parliament of the United Kingdom established in 1558
Constituencies of the Parliament of the United Kingdom disestablished in 1832
Rotten boroughs
Rushden